Hugh Brown (7 December 1921 – July 1994) was a Scottish professional footballer, who played for Partick Thistle, Torquay United and Scotland.

Notes 

1921 births
1994 deaths
Footballers from Glasgow
Association football wing halves
Scottish footballers
Scotland international footballers
Partick Thistle F.C. players
Torquay United F.C. players
Scottish Football League players
English Football League players
Scottish Football League representative players
Date of death missing